The Calvin Coolidge House is a historic house located at 19-21 Massasoit Street in Northampton, Massachusetts.  Built in 1901, it is most historically significant as the home of American President Calvin Coolidge between 1906 and 1930, the height of his political career.  It was listed on the National Register of Historic Places on December 12, 1976.

Description and history 
The Calvin Coolidge House is located in a quiet residential area west of downtown Northampton, on the east side of Massasoit Street near its junction with Arlington Street.  It is an architecturally undistinguished -story two-family wood-frame structure, with a hip roof and clapboarded exterior.  Stylistically it is basically Colonial Revival, with projecting sections to the rear of each unit, and different porch treatments on each side.  The Coolidge unit, on the left, has a gable-roofed porch supported by round columns, extending partly in front of a project polygonal bay window.  The interior also has some Colonial Revival features, including a fireplace in the front parlor with flanking Doric pilasters.

The house was built in 1900-01 by J.W. O'Brian, and its left side was rented in 1905 by Calvin Coolidge.  The Coolidges occupied that unit until 1930. This period of occupancy coincides with Coolidge's political rise from city council to Governor of Massachusetts, then Vice President and President. In 1930, Coolidge moved to "The Beeches" at 16 Hampton Terrace in Northampton, a move he said was necessitated by the increasing number of tourists coming to this address and the attendant lack of privacy.  This property is one of the most unusual of those occupied by a US president on a long-term basis, in that he did not own it, and that it was a duplex.

See also
Coolidge Homestead, his birthplace
Calvin Coolidge Bridge, carrying Route 9 between Northampton and Hadley
List of residences of presidents of the United States
National Register of Historic Places listings in Hampshire County, Massachusetts
Presidential memorials in the United States

References

External links

Buildings and structures in Northampton, Massachusetts
Calvin Coolidge
Houses completed in 1901
Houses in Hampshire County, Massachusetts
Houses on the National Register of Historic Places in Massachusetts
National Register of Historic Places in Hampshire County, Massachusetts
Presidential homes in the United States